Codex Ambrosianus 837 is a manuscript of the treatise On the Soul by Aristotle. It is designated by the symbol Dc. Paleographically it had been assigned to the 13th century. It is written in Greek minuscule letters. The manuscript contains a complete text of the treatise. 

The text of the manuscript is eclectic. It represents to the textual family σ, in I-II books of the treatise. In III book of the treatise it belongs to the family τ.

The manuscript was not cited by Tiendelenburg, Torstrik, Biehl, Apelt, or Ross in their critical editions of the treatise On the Soul. Currently it is housed at the Biblioteca Ambrosiana (837 (B 7 Inf.)) in Milan.

Other manuscripts 

 Codex Vaticanus 253
 Codex Vaticanus 260
 Codex Coislinianus 386
 Codex Ambrosianus 435

Notes and references

Further reading 

 Paweł Siwek, Aristotelis tractatus De anima graece et latine, Desclée, Romae 1965. 

13th-century manuscripts
Manuscripts of the Ambrosiana collections
Aristotelian manuscripts